G3: Live in Tokyo  is a live album and DVD recorded at the Tokyo International Forum during the 2005 G3 tour, featuring Joe Satriani, Steve Vai, and John Petrucci.

Track listing

CD track listing

Disc 1

John Petrucci
All songs written by John Petrucci
"Glasgow Kiss" - 9:18
"Damage Control" - 10:31

Steve Vai
All songs written by Steve Vai
"The Audience Is Listening" - 8:59
"Building the Church" - 6:09
"K'm-Pee-Du-Wee" - 9:16

Disc 2

Joe Satriani
All songs written by Joe Satriani
"Up in Flames" - 8:56
"Searching" - 8:44
"War" - 6:37

The G3 Jam
"Foxy Lady" (Jimi Hendrix) - 10:43
The Jimi Hendrix Experience cover
"La Grange" (Billy Gibbons, Dusty Hill, Frank Beard) - 9:18
ZZ Top cover
"Smoke on the Water" (Ian Gillan, Ritchie Blackmore, Roger Glover, Jon Lord, Ian Paice) - 12:33
Deep Purple cover

DVD track listing

John Petrucci
 "Glasgow Kiss"
 "Damage Control"

Steve Vai
"The Audience Is Listening"
 "Building the Church"
 "K'm-Pee-Du-Wee"

Joe Satriani
"Up in Flames"
 "Searching"
 "War"

The G3 Jam
"Foxy Lady"
 "La Grange"
 "Smoke on the Water"

Extras
G3 Soundcheck (15:01) with commentary by Joe Satriani, Steve Vai and John Petrucci.

Personnel

Joe Satriani
Joe Satriani - lead guitar
Galen Henson - rhythm guitar
Matt Bissonette - bass guitar
Jeff Campitelli - drums

Steve Vai
Steve Vai - lead guitar
Dave Weiner - rhythm guitar
Billy Sheehan - bass guitar
Tony Macalpine - keyboards, guitar
Jeremy Colson - drums

John Petrucci
John Petrucci - guitar
Dave LaRue - bass guitar
Mike Portnoy - drums

The G3 Jam
Joe Satriani - guitar, vocals on "Foxy Lady"
Steve Vai - guitar
John Petrucci - guitar
Matt Bissonette - bass guitar, lead vocals on "Smoke on the Water"
Billy Sheehan - bass guitar on "La Grange" and "Smoke on the Water", vocals on "La Grange", backing vocals on "Smoke on the Water"
Mike Portnoy - drums on "Foxy Lady"
Jeff Campitelli - drums on "La Grange" and "Smoke on the Water"

Charts

Weekly charts

Certifications

References

G3 (tour) albums
John Petrucci albums
Steve Vai albums
2005 video albums
Live video albums
Joe Satriani live albums
2005 live albums
Epic Records live albums
Live instrumental rock albums
Live hard rock albums